August Wilhelm Dennstedt (1776–1826), surname sometimes spelled Dennstaedt, was a German physician and botanist who was bürgermeister of Magdala, a town near Weimar. From 1817 he was scientific director of the Grand Ducal Garden in Belvedere.

He was the taxonomic author of numerous botanical taxa; three examples being the genera Bruxanelia, Coulejia and Merremia. He entered many of his taxonomic findings in the register "Schlüssel zum Hortus indicus malabaricus". The genus Dennstaedtia Bernh. (family Dennstaedtiaceae) is named in his honor.

Published works 
 Weimar's Flora: Pflanzen mit deutlichen Geschlechtern, Volume 1, 1800.
 Pflanzen mit Luftgefäßen, 1807.
 Nomenclator botanicus: seu, Enumeratio alphabetica omnium hucusque cognitorum vegetabilium, adjectis praecipuis synonymis, 1810.
 Das Gewächsreich: oder characterisirende Beschreibung aller zur Zeit bekannten Gewächse.
 Hortus Belvedereanus. Oder Verzeichniss der bestimmten Pflanzen, 1820.

References 

1776 births
1826 deaths
19th-century German botanists
People from Weimarer Land